Wilhelm Cramer (2 June 1746, Mannheim – 5 October 1799, London) was a famous London violinist and musical conductor of German origin. He was part of a large family who were connected with music during both the 18th and 19th centuries. He is the father of the famous English composer Johann Baptist Cramer (24 February 1771 – 16 April 1858).

Cramer Street in London's Marylebone district is named after him.

Sources

Further reading
 W. B. Squire, rev. David J. Golby. Cramer, Wilhelm (bap. 1746, d. 1799), Oxford Dictionary of National Biography first published Sept. 2004
 Warwick Lister. Music & Letters, Wilhelm Cramer and the Opera Concert Orchestra: 'Damnatio Memoriae'?, Vol. 82, No. 1 (2001), p. 78, Oxford University Press

External links
Wilhelm Cramer portrait by the English painter Thomas Hardy (1757-circa 1805).

1746 births
1799 deaths
English conductors (music)
British male conductors (music)
German expatriates in England
English violinists
British male violinists
Pupils of Johann Stamitz
18th-century conductors (music)